Harold Barker (1886–1937) was a British rower.

Harold Barker may also refer to:

Harold H. Barker (1889–1949), American politician
Gregg Barton (1912–2000), real name Harold Barker, American actor

See also
Harry Barker (disambiguation)